The Aston Martin DB2/4 is a grand tourer produced by Aston Martin from 1953 until 1957. It was available as a 2+2 hatchback saloon,  drophead coupé (DHC) and 2-seat fixed-head coupé. A small number of Bertone bodied spiders were commissioned by private buyers.

Overview
The DB2/4 was based on the DB2, which it replaced. Changes included a wraparound windscreen, larger bumpers, and repositioned headlights. The body was designed by draftsman John Turner who was 17 years of age at the time.

The Lagonda straight-6 engine, designated the VB6E, was initially the same dual overhead cam straight-6 designed by W. O. Bentley and used in the Vantage version of the DB2. Displacement was 2.6 L (2,580 cc/157 in³), giving 125 hp (93 kW). In September 1953 for the Saloon and in April 1954 for the Drophead, a 2.9 L (2,922 cc/178 in³) VB6J version was used, raising power to 140 hp (104 kW) and maximum speed to 120 mph (193 km/h).

Of the 565 Mark I models produced, 102 were Drophead Coupés.

The test car cost £2621 including taxes.

Three works cars were prepared for the 1955 Monte Carlo Rally and two for the Mille Miglia.  Aston Martin pursued its competitive ambitions more intently with the DB3, which was designed specifically for sports-car racing.

A DB2/4 Mk I Drophead Coupé appeared in the 1963 Alfred Hitchcock film The Birds

Mark II

The DB2/4 Mk II model, introduced in 1955, offered an optional large-valve, high compression (8.6:1) 165 hp (123 kW) engine. Other changes included small tailfins, bubble-type tail lights as on the Morris Minor, and added chrome. The bonnet horizontal split line was also changed from door sill height to a line carried backwards from the top of the front wheel arch.

A 2-seat Fixed Head Coupé (FHC) was new, in addition to the continued Drophead. 34 of the 199 Mark II models used this new coupé body, which was the style chosen by David Brown for his own car. Three Mark II chassis were sent to Carrozzeria Touring in Italy to be bodied as Spider models. Touring would later help Aston with the Superleggera design of the DB4.

One significant behind-the-scenes change for the Mark II was the relocation of coachbuilding responsibilities from Mulliner's of Feltham to Tickford's works in Newport Pagnell. Brown had purchased Tickford in 1954 and would move all of Aston Martin's operations there with the start of DB4 production.

Production
 Mark I: 565
 Drophead Coupé: 102
 Bertone Spider: 4 or 5
 Mark II: 199
 Fixed Head Coupé: 34
 Drophead Coupé: 16
 Touring Spider: 3

References

Further reading

External links

An original Aston Martin DB2/4 sales brochure Aston.co.uk

DB2 4
Cars introduced in 1953
24 Hours of Le Mans race cars
Hatchbacks
Rear-wheel-drive vehicles
Coupés